Zala or Zaļā may refer to:

Places

Angola
 Zala, Angola, a town and commune in the province of Bengo

Ethiopia
 Zala (woreda), a woreda (district) in the Gamo Gofa Zone of the Southern Nations, Nationalities, and Peoples' Region
 Zala Ubamale, a woreda in the Southern Nations, Nationalities, and Peoples' Region of Ethiopia
 Zala, a village in the Degol Woyane tabia in Tigray Region

Hungary
 Zala County (former)
 Zala County
 Zala (river)
 Zala (village), Somogy County

Latvia
 Zaļā Manor, a manor house in Courland
 Zaļenieki Manor, also called Zaļā Manor, a manor house near Jelgava

Slovenia
 Zala, Cerknica, a settlement in the Municipality of Cerknica
 Zala, Železniki, a settlement in the Municipality of Železniki

Tibet
 Zala, Tibet, a village in the Tibet Autonomous Region of China

Characters
 Athrun Zala, a character of the Cosmic Era timeline of the Gundam series
 Patrick Zala, a character of the Cosmic Era timeline of the Gundam series 
 Zala, a character from the PlayStation 3 launch title Untold Legends: Dark Kingdom
 Zala, a character from Millennium series trilogy book series

Other uses
 Zala (surname)
 Zala Park, Zanzibar
 ZALA Aero Group, a Russian company specialising in drone development
 Zaļā zeme, a novel by Latvian poet Andrejs Upīts